ZK may refer to:

 ZK (framework), an AJAX/XUL Web Application Framework
 ZK (rapper), Danish rapper and singer
 Great Lakes Airlines (IATA airline designator ZK)
 Zentralkomitee, the executive body of the Socialist Unity Party of Germany
 Zero-knowledge, a cryptographic proof concept
 Zero-K, an open source RTS computer game
 Zettakelvin, an SI unit of temperature
 the alleged publisher of Sad Satan